The Lordship of  or  (Old French for "beyond the Jordan", also called Lordship of Montreal) was the name used during the Crusades for an extensive and partly undefined region to the east of the Jordan River, an area known in ancient times as Edom and Moab. It was also referred to as Transjordan.

Geography and demography
Oultrejordain extended southwards through the Negev to the Gulf of Aqaba (Ile de Graye, now Pharaoh's Island). To the north and east (the ancient Gilead) there were no real borders — to the north was the Dead Sea and to the east were caravan and pilgrimage routes, part of the Muslim Hejaz. These areas were also under the control of the sultan of Damascus, and by custom the two opponents rarely met there, for battle or for other purposes.

History
Before the First Crusade, Oultrejordain was controlled by the Fatimids of Egypt, whose representatives (originally very few, if any at all) withdrew when the Crusaders arrived. The various tribes there quickly made peace with the Crusaders. The first expedition to the area was under Baldwin I of Jerusalem in 1100. Baldwin also invaded again in 1107 and 1112, and built Montreal in 1115 to control the Muslim caravan routes, which provided enormous revenue to the kingdom. The crusaders also controlled the area around Petra, where they set up an archbishopric under the authority of the Latin Patriarch of Jerusalem.

There were very few Christians in Oultrejordain, most of the inhabitants being Shia Bedouin nomads. Many of the Syriac Orthodox Christians who lived there were transplanted to Jerusalem in 1115 to fill up the former Jewish quarter (the Jews had been either killed or expelled). The other Christians who lived in Oultrejordain were nomadic or semi-nomadic and were often distrusted by the Crusaders.

According to John of Ibelin, the Lordship of Oultrejordain was one of the four major Vassals of the Kingdom of Jerusalem. John, writing in the 13th century, called it a lordship, but it may have been treated as a principality in the 12th century. It was established after the expedition of Baldwin I, but due to the relative size and inaccessibility of the area, the lords of Oultrejordain tended to claim some independence from the kingdom. With its mostly undefined borders, it was one of the largest seigneuries. Baldwin I may have given it away to Roman of Le Puy in 1118, but it probably remained under royal control until 1126 when Pagan the Butler was created lord (1126–1147). There was also a tradition that the ruler of Oultrejordain could not hold any other positions in the kingdom at the same time, so they were somewhat cut off from political life. Around 1134 a revolt occurred against King Fulk under Hugh II of Jaffa (Hugh II of Le Puiset), count of Jaffa, and Roman of Le Puy (who was possibly lord of Oultrejordain). They were defeated and exiled. In 1142, Fulk built the castle of Kerak (Crac des Moabites), replacing Montreal as the Crusader stronghold in the area. Other castles in Oultrejordain included Safed and Subeibe. Toron, near Tyre, and Nablus, in Judea, were not located in Oultrejordain, though they were sometimes ruled by the same people, usually through marriage.

In 1148, the lord of Oultrejordain was involved in the decision to attack Damascus during the Second Crusade, despite the truce between Jerusalem and Damascus that was vital to the survival of the kingdom and especially the lordship. The crusade ended in defeat and the security of the lordship diminished as a result.

Maurice of Montreal left the lordship to his daughter Isabella (c. 1125 – 1166) and her husband Philip of Milly, lord of Nablus, who was compelled to resign Nablus in order to be recognized as ruler of Oultrejordain. After Isabella died, Philip (who ruled Oultrejordain 1161 – 1168) became a warrior-monk and finally Grand Master of the Knights Templar. Meanwhile, their son-in-law Humphrey III of Toron, son of the royal constable Humphrey II, had become ruler of Oultrejordain in right of his wife, their daughter Stephanie de Milly. Stephanie's later husbands, Miles of Plancy and Raynald of Châtillon, also became lords of Oultrejordain in turn.

Raynald of Châtillon, formerly Prince of Antioch through his wife Constance, became lord of Oultrejordain by his new marriage to Stephanie in 1177. He began to claim that the king had no authority in Oultrejordain and acted as a petty king himself. He used his position to attack pilgrims and caravans, and threatened to attack Mecca, which resulted in an invasion of the kingdom by Saladin in 1187. Raynald was executed after the Battle of Hattin on July 4 of that year. By 1189 Saladin had taken all of Oultrejordain and destroyed its castles. In 1229 Jerusalem was briefly recovered by treaty by Frederick II, Holy Roman Emperor, but the remnant of the kingdom never again controlled territory to the east of the Jordan. The principality was of course claimed by crusader nobles for a long time, the title passing to the line of Isabelle de Toron, daughter of Stephanie, and for several generations belonged to Montfort family, who were lords of Tyre. After the 1350s, when the Montfort line became extinct without close heirs, the hereditary rights presumably passed to the kings of Cyprus who also were descendants of lords of Toron and Tyre.

While under Crusader control, the Bedouin nomads were generally left to themselves, although the king collected taxes on caravans passing through. The land was relatively good for agriculture, and wheat, pomegranates and olives were grown there. Salt was also collected from the Dead Sea.

Oultrejordain was also known in Latin as Transjordan, and covered territory that would later become part of the Emirate of Transjordan and the modern country of Jordan.

Lords of Oultrejordain
Roman of Le Puy (possibly 1118 – 1126)
Pagan the Butler (1126–1147)
Maurice of Montreal (1147–1161)
Philip of Milly (1161–1168) and his wife Isabella, daughter of Maurice
Stephanie de Milly, daughter and heiress, whose husbands exercised the powers of the lordship:
Humphrey III of Toron (1168–1173), first husband of Stephanie
Miles of Plancy (1173–1174), second husband of Stephanie
Raynald of Châtillon (1176–1187), third husband of Stephanie.
Humphrey IV of Toron (1187–1197), son of Stephanie from her first marriage to Humphrey III of Toron, titular Prince of Oultrejordain, Lord of Toron
Alice of Armenia (possibly 1197 – 1199), niece of Humphrey IV of Toron, titular Princess of Oultrejordain, Lady of Toron

Sub-vassals
In the time of Philip of Nablus, Arabian Petra was a vassal fief under the princes of Oultrejordain.

Sources
John L. La Monte, Feudal Monarchy in the Latin Kingdom of Jerusalem, 1100–1291. The Medieval Academy of America, 1932. 
Jonathan Riley-Smith, The Feudal Nobility and the Kingdom of Jerusalem, 1174–1277. The Macmillan Press, 1973. 
Steven Runciman, A History of the Crusades, Vol. II: The Kingdom of Jerusalem and the Frankish East, 1100–1187. Cambridge University Press, 1952.
Steven Tibble, Monarchy and Lordships in the Latin Kingdom of Jerusalem, 1099–1291. Clarendon Press, 1989.

Oultrejordain
Lordships of the Crusader states
Medieval Jordan
1110s establishments in the Kingdom of Jerusalem
1180s disestablishments in the Kingdom of Jerusalem
1118 establishments
1187 disestablishments
Transjordan (region)